Dom Kelly may refer to:

Dom Kelly (footballer) (1917–1982), English footballer
Dom Kelly (musician), American musician